Entypesidae is a family of African mygalomorphae spiders. It was first described in 2020, and includes three genera moved from the funnel-web trapdoor spiders (family Nemesiidae).

Genera
, the World Spider Catalog accepts the following genera:
Afropesa Zonstein & Ríos-Tamayo, 2021 – South Africa
Brachytheliscus Pocock, 1902 – South Africa
Entypesa Simon, 1902 – Madagascar
Hermacha Simon, 1889 – South America, Africa
Hermachola Hewitt, 1915 – South Africa
Lepthercus Purcell, 1902 – South Africa

References

 
Mygalomorphae families